Xanthoparmelia arida is a lichen which belongs to the Xanthoparmelia genus. The lichen is an arid shield lichen and is uncommon it is listed as apparently secure by the Nature Conservatory. It is noted for being similar to Xanthoparmelia joranadia.

Description 
Grows to around 3–8 cm in diameter with board dull yellow-green sub irregular lobes that extend 1–3 mm wide. The underside is pale brown with simple rhizines approximately 0.3-0.6 mm long.

Habitat and range 
Found in the North American southwest particularly in the US state of Texas.

Chemistry 
Xanthoparmelia arida has been recorded containing both Lecanoric and usnic acids.

See also 

 List of Xanthoparmelia species

References 

arida
Lichen species
Lichens of North America
Lichens described in 1979